The 1957 Indiana Hoosiers football team represented the Indiana Hoosiers in the 1957 Big Ten Conference football season. The Hoosiers played their home games at Memorial Stadium in Bloomington, Indiana. The team was led by Bob Hicks, in his only year as head coach of the Hoosiers.

Schedule

1958 NFL draftees

References

Indiana
Indiana Hoosiers football seasons
Indiana Hoosiers football